Wilson Hart Clark (1820-May 13, 1887) was an American lawyer and politician.

Clark was born in Woodbridge, Conn., in 1820. During his early life he assisted his father on his farm, and at the age of twenty left home to pursue a course of study in Wilbraham, Mass, with the intention of becoming a lawyer.

He graduated from Yale Law School in 1845.  For more than thirty years after taking his degree he practiced his profession in New Haven, and attracted a large business. He was also prominent in local politics, having been at different times a member of the Common Council of the city, prosecuting attorney, and a member of the Connecticut State Senate for two terms (1859–60); while in the Senate he was one of the ex officio members of the Yale Corporation.  He died suddenly, after several years of poor health, at the residence of one of his daughters, in Ansonia, Conn., May 13, 1887, in his 67th year.

He married in 1849 Julia Elizabeth Cable, of Oxford, who survived him with three daughters.

External links

1820 births
1887 deaths
People from Woodbridge, Connecticut
Yale Law School alumni
Connecticut lawyers
Connecticut state senators
19th-century American politicians
Politicians from New Haven, Connecticut
Lawyers from New Haven, Connecticut
19th-century American lawyers